Modular redundancy may refer to:

 Dual modular redundancy, in reliability engineering where system components are duplicated
 Triple modular redundancy, in reliability engineering where system components are triplicated